José Luis Ballester may refer to:

José Luis Ballester (swimmer) (born 1969), Spanish former swimmer
José Luis Ballester (sailor) (born 1968), Spanish sailor